"Make Peace Not War" is a song by British MC Skepta. It was released on 13 May 2012, as a digital download on iTunes in the United Kingdom. The song peaked at number 29 on the UK Singles Chart.

Music video
A music video to accompany the release of "Make Peace Not War" was first released onto YouTube on 9 March 2012, at a 
total length of three minutes and twenty-eight seconds.

Track listings

Chart performance

Weekly charts

Release history

References

2012 singles
Skepta songs
2011 songs
All Around the World Productions singles
Songs written by Robert Clivillés
Songs written by Skepta
3 Beat Records singles